Shlomo Bar-Shavit (December 7, 1928 – September 8, 2019) was an Israeli actor, voice actor and theatre director.

Biography
Born in Jerusalem, his father was a construction worker and his mother, who was the granddaughter of Shlomo Elyashiv, was a nurse at the Shaare Zedek Medical Center. When Bar-Shavit was four years old, he was abandoned by his parents after they separated and he spent a majority of his childhood in 13 different foster institutions. At the age of nine, Bar-Shavit wanted to become an actor after witnessing a play that one of the foster homes organised and he got his first experience as a stage actor at the Habima Theatre in Tel Aviv in the late 1940s.

In 1948, Bar-Shavit enlisted in the IDF and joined up with the Chizbatron. From 1949 onwards, Bar-Shavit acted in many Habima plays, which includes Othello, The Taming of the Shrew, Peer Gynt, Kazablan, Irma La Douce, Richard III and many more. He received mixed reviews in his performance in a play about the 1947–1949 Palestine war. He also once received uproar from some audience members because of his portrayal of Josef Mengele in a play about the Holocaust. For a number of years, Bar-Shavit was on the Habima's management team and served as an artistic director and in 1999, he directed a theatrical adaptation of The Eternal Husband by Fyodor Dostoevsky.

In cinema and television, Bar-Shavit made his debut screen appearance in the 1964 film Bring the Girls to Eilat. He also starred in the 1970 film Lupo! directed by Menahem Golan. From 2009 until 2011, he had a recurring role as the father of the central protagonist in the television series Polishuk and he appeared in the season 9 episode premiere of Life is Not Everything. As a voice actor, he dubbed the voices of characters into the Hebrew language. These include Rafiki in The Lion King films, Jasper in One Hundred and One Dalmatians, Fagin in Oliver & Company and he also served as the voice of Dumbledore in the first two Harry Potter films before he was replaced by Albert Cohen.

In 2001, Bar-Shavit released an autobiography. Three years later, a documentary was released detailing his life.

Personal life
Bar-Shavit was married and had one son and two daughters. He and his family resided in Tel Aviv.

Death
On September 8, 2019, Bar-Shavit died in Tel Aviv Sourasky Medical Center from complications of pneumonia at the age of 90. Prior to his death, he was confined to a wheelchair and was battling a variety of health issues, including Parkinson's disease.

References

External links

 
 

1928 births
2019 deaths
Male actors from Jerusalem
Israeli people of Lithuanian-Jewish descent
People with Parkinson's disease
Chizbatron members
Israeli male film actors
Israeli male stage actors
Israeli male musical theatre actors
Israeli male voice actors
Israeli male television actors
Israeli theatre directors
Israeli artistic directors
Jewish Israeli male actors
20th-century Israeli male actors
21st-century Israeli male actors
21st-century Israeli male writers
Deaths from pneumonia in Israel